Pravarakhyudu is a 2009 Indian Telugu-language romance film, produced by Ganesh Indukuri on Tolly 2 holly films banner and directed by Madan. The film stars Jagapati Babu, Priyamani and music is composed by M.M. Keeravani. The film was released on 4 December 2009.

Plot
The film begins with Sasi an eminent Zoology professor from Harvard returning from abroad after several years. Forthwith, he pays attention to his nuptial and goes on bride-hunting. However, he dislikes them, reminds his one-time sweetheart Sailaja and moves rearward to their college days. Sailaja is a meritorious student who has faith in tradition, love, and romance with conceit. In those days, Sasi had a strange mindset and failed to feel any emotion. He views the world as versatile which confuses Sailaja but later she comprehends the reality and loves Sasi. At that point, Sasi states that she is under vacillating on infatuation as he strongly opinions men & women are only for sexual interaction. Hearing it, Sailaja loathes with salvos and quits Sasi's life.

Presently, Sailaja is a lofty, adamant, headstrong principal of a women's college who constrains new methods of her own. Sasi seeks one chance to have a confab which she turns down. Hence, he pulls strings, is designated as a lecturer in Sailaja's college, and tenant at home. Therefrom, lots of girls including lecturers lure by his charm which envies Sailaja. After a series of donnybrook, Sasi makes meteoritic changes, boosts the fortitude of the girls, and makes clear that Sailaja's system is rubbish. Moreover, he summits the organization to international standards. Accordingly, Sasi & Sailaja with 3 students proceed to South Africa where the teenagers lust him. Anyhow Sasi stands firm and transforms them when Sailaja understands his righteousness.

Soon after return, Sailaja walks to express her acceptance when she overhears that Sasi approached her after consideration of manifold matches when her ego hurts. So, she goes forth to college for resigning and leave the town. Sasi is behind, slaps, and divulges to her about his past. Indeed, he is a neglected child by his parents who also performed a love marriage that used to always wrangle, split for some time, and reunited. Plus, he never received his motherly affection as she is beauty conscious and not even present when he is ailed. Thus, a great impact had been created on Sasi's mind that all human relations are for necessity only. Later, he regrets being aware that his mother is the one who saved him from danger. Forthwith, his heart bloomed with love and rushed for her. Right now, he presents his appeal before Sailaja and marches on. The total campus listens to the conversation and pleads with her to accept. At last, Sailaja gives her approval which delights everyone. The movie ends on a happy note with the marriage of Sasi and Sailaja.

Cast

 Jagapati Babu as Sasi Kumar
 Priyamani as Sailaja
 Brahmanandam
 Sunil as Ravi
 Ali as Cycle
 Dharmavarapu Subramanyam
 Chalapathi Rao
 AVS
 CVL Narasimha Rao
 Ravi Varma
 Samrat
 Chalaki Chanti
 Hamsa Nandini
 Madhu Sharma
 Pooja
 Rajya Lakshmi
 Radha Kumari
 Rashmi Gautam
 Anithanath
 Monica
 Sonam
 Ramya
 Rajani Iyer
 Vasavi
 Lirisha 
 Noel Sean

Soundtrack

Music was composed by M.M. Keeravani and released by ADITYA Music Company. Lyrics were written by Chaitanya Prasad.

References

2009 films
2000s Telugu-language films
Films scored by M. M. Keeravani